Fighting Love is a 1927 American silent drama film directed by Nils Olaf Chrisander and starring Jetta Goudal, Victor Varconi and Henry B. Walthall. The film survives complete. It is based on the 1925 novel If the Gods Laugh by the British writer and explorer Rosita Forbes. The film's sets were designed by the art director Anton Grot.

Synopsis
After discovering her fiancée kissing another woman, Vittoria marries a family friend in a marriage of convenience and accompanies him to the Italian colony of Libya. While there she encounters a handsome young man and falls in love with him. Wrongly believing her husband to have been killed in a Bedouin attack, the two undergo an Arab wedding ceremony with him. When she discovers the truth she returns to her husband.

Cast
 Jetta Goudal as Donna Vittoria 
 Victor Varconi as Gabriel Amari 
 Henry B. Walthall as Filipo Navarro 
 Louis Natheaux as Dario Niccolini 
 Josephine Crowell as Princess Torini 
 Eulalie Jensen as Zillah

References

Bibliography
 Goble, Alan. The Complete Index to Literary Sources in Film. Walter de Gruyter, 1999.

External links
 

1927 films
1927 drama films
1920s English-language films
American silent feature films
Silent American drama films
Films directed by Nils Olaf Chrisander
American black-and-white films
Producers Distributing Corporation films
Films based on British novels
Films set in Italy
Films set in Libya
1920s American films